Johs Elvestad (17 May 1899 – 5 November 1989) was a Norwegian composer. His work was part of the music event in the art competition at the 1932 Summer Olympics.

References

External links
 

1899 births
1989 deaths
Norwegian male composers
Olympic competitors in art competitions
Composers from Oslo
20th-century Norwegian male musicians